Okučani railway station is a railway station on Novska–Tovarnik railway in Croatia. Located in Okučani. Railroad continued to Novska in one and the other direction to Nova Gradiška. Okučani railway station consists of 6 railway track.

See also 
 Croatian Railways
 Zagreb–Belgrade railway

References 

Railway stations in Croatia
Buildings and structures in Brod-Posavina County